About Us is the debut studio album by Australian indie pop singer G Flip. The album was released on 30 August 2019.

Prior to the album's release, the songs were described as about "heartbreak and reconciliation". G Flip said: "I thought about releasing an album a lot growing up, I would sit in the lounge room holding dad's record collection in awe, I was intrigued, I wanted my own. It's a big moment, I'm super stoked to drop my debut."

The album was supported by an Australian tour, commencing in Adelaide on 8 November 2019.

At the ARIA Music Awards of 2019, the album was nominated for two awards; Breakthrough Artist and Best Independent Release, "Drink Too Much" was nominated for Best Video.

At the J Awards of 2019, the album was nominated for Australian Album of the Year.

At the AIR Awards of 2020, the album was nominated for Best Independent Pop Album or EP.

A deluxe version of the album was released on 17 January 2020, featuring 4 live tracks.

Reception

Simone Ziaziaris from Sydney Morning Herald said "G Flip draws from [their] own personal experiences to sound deeply personal and honest – so much so, that by the end of the album you feel as if you've known [them] for years." adding "Kindling the success of the album is G Flip's talent in building pop-gems out of a simple synth riff, bouncy piano chords and incredibly smooth vocals. It's a skill [G Flip] applies to [their] singles, 'I Am Not Afraid', 'Drink Too Much' and 'Killing My Time', and one [they]'ll no doubt pull off on hits to come."

James d'Apice from The Music AU said "Thanks to [their] drumming background, rhythm comes naturally to G Flip. That insight is too reductive though. G Flip's real triumph is neither a command of rhythm, nor of melody, but [their] command of character – as an artist, [G Flip] is compelling. As much as About Us might sound like it's about someone else, it's really about our G Flip and the authentic approach [they take] to the world around [them], and to [their] music."

Some Fuamoli from Triple J said "Born out of a concentrated period of chaos, G Flip's debut album is anchored by self-introspection and raw emotion." and described About Us as "...a snapshot of young lives in flux; finding your own place in a relationship and with yourself. It's a look at the still-firming personal ground of any 20-something."

Zoë Radas from Stack Magazine said "For someone as obsessed with rhythm as G Flip, [they] also [have] a falcon's grip on melodic pop hooks which are both meaty and fluid as rain. [Their] vocals can belt boldly or come in ultra-close, as in the exhilarating single 'Bring Me Home'".

David Bennun from Metro News said "About Us, which details a relationship with an on-off girlfriend, is typified by big percussion and great washes of keyboards, topped with an insinuating croon that feels not as fully [their] own as the music behind it."

Heather Phares from AllMusic said "Flipo finds ways to give About Us more personality whenever [their] tales of lust and heartache could become generic... [and] by the time the album closes with the happily ever after of '2 Million', Flipo proves that in love and in [their] music, [they're] never less than fully committed -- and that's what makes About Us a promising debut."

Track listing

Charts

Weekly charts

Year-end charts

Release history

References

2019 debut albums
G Flip albums